C. Josh Donlan is ecologist and conservation practitioner who founded and leads Advanced Conservation Strategies (ACS). The environmental conservation NGO focuses on program design, sustainability sciences, and evaluation. He has published over 100 peer-reviewed scientific and popular articles, some of them receiving widespread media attention. He is currently a Research Fellow at the Cornell Lab of Ornithology. He splits his time between the Wasatch Mountains and Andalucia.

Career history and awards
2008–2017: Visiting Fellow, Department of Ecology & Evolutionary Biology, Cornell University
2012–2014: Invited Professor, University of South Paris, France
2011-2012: Visiting Professor, Universidad de Magallanes, Chile
2010: Guggenheim Fellowship
2008: Selected for The Best American Science and Nature Writing 2008 by Houghton Mifflin
2008: Conservation Fellow, The Kinship Foundation
2002: Fellow, Environmental Leadership Program
1998 Robert & Patricia Switzer Foundation Fellow

Selected works
2019: The characterization of seafood mislabeling: A global meta analysis
2019: Exploring the causes of seafood fraud: A meta-analysis on mislabeling and price
2015: A human-centered framework for innovation in conservation incentive programs
2015: Proactive Strategies for Protecting Species: Pre-listing Conservation and the Endangered Species Act 
2015: Incentivizing biodiversity conservation with artisanal fishing communities through territorial user rights and business model innovation 
2013: Gene tweaking for conservation 
2011: Archipelago-wide island restoration in the Galapagos Islands: Reducing costs of invasive mammal eradication programs and reinvasion risk 
2011: Paul S. Martin (1928-2010): Luminary, natural historian, and innovator
2011: Biodiversity offsets: an interim solution to seabird bycatch in fisheries? 
2010: A derivative approach to endangered species conservation 
2009: Debt investment as a tool for value transfer in biodiversity conservation 
2007: Restoring America’s big, wild animals 
2006: Pleistocene Rewilding: an optimistic agenda for twenty-first century conservation 
2005: Re-wilding North America 
2002: Golden eagles, feral pigs and island foxes: how exotic species turn native predators into prey

References

American ecologists
Living people
Year of birth missing (living people)
University of California, Berkeley alumni
Cornell University College of Agriculture and Life Sciences alumni
Cornell University faculty
Amherst College faculty